Ayam pop is a fried chicken dish commonly found in Indonesia, consisting of chicken deep fried in oil. The dish contains skinless pale fried chicken that has been boiled or steamed prior to frying. Although ayam pop is identified as ayam goreng (fried chicken), ayam pop is different from common ayam goreng. While fried chicken is golden brown, ayam pop is light-colored. The dish originates from Minangkabau cuisine in West Sumatra.

See also

Cuisine of Indonesia
Minangkabau cuisine
Ayam goreng
List of chicken dishes

References

Indonesian chicken dishes
Fried chicken
Deep fried foods